Daniel Altmaier was the defending champion but chose not to defend his title.

Jan-Lennard Struff won the title after defeating Maximilian Marterer 6–2, 6–2 in the final.

Seeds

Draw

Finals

Top half

Bottom half

References

External links
Main draw
Qualifying draw

Brawo Open - 1
2022 Singles